Robert Blair may refer to:

Entertainment
 Robert Blair (poet) (1699–1746), Scottish poet
 Robert Noel Blair (1912–2003), American painter and sculptor
 Robert Blair (musician) (1930–2001), American gospel musician

Law
 Robert Blair, Lord Avontoun (1741–1811), Scottish lawyer, son of poet Robert Blair
 Robert A. Blair, justice of the Court of Appeal for Ontario
 Robert Blair (politician) (died 1861), English-born judge and politician in Nova Scotia

Sports
 Robert Blair (cricketer) (1858–1912), New Zealand cricketer
 Robert Blair (badminton) (born 1981), badminton player from Great Britain

Other
 Robert Blair (moderator) (1593–1666), Scottish clergyman
 Robert Blair (minister) (1837–1907), Scottish minister
 Robert Blair (astronomer) (1748–1828), Scottish astronomer
 Robert Blair (VC) (1834–1859), Victoria Cross winner
 Robert M. Blair (1836–1899), American Civil War sailor and Medal of Honor recipient
 S. Robert Blair (1929–2009), Canadian businessman
 W. Robert Blair (1930–2014), American politician
 Robert Blair (farmer) (born 1968), specializing in precision agriculture and Unmanned Air Vehicles 
 Robert Blair (political advisor) (born 1972), American official

See also
 Bob Blair (cricketer) (born 1932), former New Zealand cricketer
 Blair